Saving Jessica Lynch is a 2003 American television film that aired on NBC and featured Canadian actress Laura Regan in the title role. The film begins with the ambush of Jessica Lynch's convoy in the middle of an Iraqi city and follows a version of events that credits an Iraqi citizen, Mohammed Odeh al-Rehaief, with being responsible for helping to arrange a daring rescue by US special operations forces.

Cast

 Michael Rooker as Colonel Curry, who helps plan the rescue mission
 Nicholas Guilak as Mohammed Al-Rehaief
 Laura Regan as Private First Class Jessica Lynch
 Brent Sexton as Greg Lynch Sr., Jessica's father
 Mark Moses as a Lieutenant
 Benjamin King as 1st Sergeant Robert J. Dowdy
 Crystle Lightning as PFC Lori Piestewa
 Susan Pari as Iman Al-Rehaief
 Denise Lee as Specialist Shoshana Johnson
 Brent Anderson as Capt. Troy King
 Amy Jones as Dee Lynch
 Ethan Rains as Iman Nazemzadeh (Iraqi Deserter) 
 Rafael Tamayo as Specialist Edgar Hernandez
 Dak Rasheta as Sergeant James Riley (as Dak Rashetta)
 Reed Frerichs as Pvt. Dale Nace
 Oliver Tull as Sgt George Buggs
 Josh Berry as Specialist Edward Anguiano
 Donny Boaz as Patrick Miller (soldier)

Inaccuracies
Although the film was based on a true story, most of the circumstances of the rescue have been challenged by the media as well as by Lynch herself. Lynch was portrayed as a heroic soldier who fought up to her capture. In reality, at the time of the crash of her vehicle, she was knocked unconscious and woke up at the hospital with serious injuries. Her rescue operation was carried out at an unresisting civilian hospital.  In a review of the movie, Hal Erickson wrote, "An inordinate amount of poetic license is taken with the events surrounding Jessica's rescue, with a plethora of ridiculous coincidences and serial-like thrills and chills thrown in to pep up the story."

Notes

External links

2003 television films
2003 films
Films set in Iraq
NBC network original films
Iraq War in television
War films based on actual events
Films about the United States Army
Films scored by Ramin Djawadi
Films with screenplays by John Fasano
Films directed by Peter Markle
2000s English-language films